Gustavsen is a common family name in Scandinavian countries. Notable people with the surname include:

Music
Tord Gustavsen (born 1970), Norwegian jazz pianist
Tord Gustavsen Trio, Norwegian jazz trio
Troels Gustavsen (born 1991), Danish singer and also part of duo Noah

Politics
Øyvind Gustavsen (born 1937), Norwegian civil servant
Finn Gustavsen (1926-2005), Norwegian politician
Laila Gustavsen, (born 1973), Norwegian politician
Terje Moe Gustavsen (born 1954), Norwegian politician

Sports
Henrik Gustavsen (born 1992), Norwegian football (soccer) player

Others
Bjørn Gustavsen (born 1938), Norwegian academic and researcher

See also
Gustafson, includes Gustafson, Gustafsson, Gustavson, or Gustavsson

Danish-language surnames
Norwegian-language surnames
Surnames from given names